The smallspot moray (Gymnothorax microstictus) is a moray eel found in the western central Pacific Ocean around Papua New Guinea. It was first named by Böhlke in 2000.

References

External links
 Fishes of Australia : Gymnothorax microstictus

smallspot moray
Marine fish of Northern Australia
smallspot moray